Herman or Hermain is a village and tehsil located in Shopian district of Jammu and Kashmir, India. Herman was made a tehsil in 2014 by the State government of Jammu and Kashmir. Herman has 29 villages. In Herman there is a tehsil office in which a Tehsildar is serving the people.

Agriculture
Agriculture is the main occupation of Herman village. Apple growing is the main source of livelihood of majority of households

Financial institutions
Banks and finance institutions has also established their branches in the village. In Hermain there is a branch of J&K Bank having an ATM.
Ellaqui Dehatti Bank Branch. A branch of central cooperative bank also is working there.

Population and geographical area
According to the 2011 census, Herman has a total population of 3,334 peoples. There are about 513 houses in Herman village. In 2011, the literacy rate of Herman village was 62.60%. In Herman, Male literacy stands at 72.44% while female literacy rate was 53.66%.

References

Villages in Shopian district